Ángel Ortiz may refer to:

 Ángel Ortiz (footballer) (born 1977), Paraguayan footballer
 Ángel Ortiz (scientist) (1966–2008), Spanish scientist
Angel Ortiz is the name of American graffiti artist LA II
 Angel Ortiz (born 1991), American professional wrestler who goes by the ring name Ortiz